Premier Music International Limited is an English musical instruments manufacturing company based in Kibworth. The company, founded in 1922, currently produces drum kits, sticks and accessories.

History 
Premier was established in 1922 when a drummer, Albert Della Porta, partnered with George Smith to establish a company. They set up on Berwick Street in London, and were soon joined by Albert's brother Fred, who eventually became the first sales manager of the recently created company.

In the beginning, they manufactured drums for other companies like John E. Dallas (with the "Jedson" trademark), then starting with "Premier" instruments. Early drum kits consisted of a bass drum, a snare, a stand, a cymbal, and sometimes a small tom-tom. The company grew to two factories, ending up in West London's Park Royal. By 1938 they were also producing brass instruments, as well as supplying drums to the armed forces. The company even built a guitar called "Premier Vox", in the early 1930s.

During World War II, the Government forced Premier to manufacture gun sights and electrical plugs and sockets for radar equipment. After the West London factory was bombed in 1940, the company moved to the Leicestershire town of South Wigston, where they occupied three small factories.

By 1986, Premier was one of the biggest factories in South Wigston, with 100,000 square feet covered and 180 employees. The company also exported its products to 120 countries. However, in 2005 after 65 years of activity, Premier finally closed the factory and the entire site was eventually demolished in 2017. Once established in its new home in Kibworth Harcourt, Leicestershire, the brand was purchased by the online retailer Gear4music on 21 June 2021.

Artists 

 Ringo Starr - The Beatles
 Julien Brown – Massive Attack
 Rick Buckler – The Jam
 Clem Burke – Blondie
 Phil Collins – Genesis
 Bobby Elliott – The Hollies
 Ginger Fish – Marylin Manson, Rob Zombie
 Nick Mason – Pink Floyd
 Nicko McBrain – Iron Maiden
 Mitch Mitchell – The Jimi Hendrix Experience
 Keith Moon – The Who
 Philip Selway – Radiohead
 Brad Wilk – Rage Against the Machine
 Johnny Blitz - Dead Boys

Drum lines
 APK/XPK series
Elite Series (1970s)
 Resonator Series 
 Soundwave Series (1970s & 1980s)
 Black Shadow – A unique run of the Resonator series with a specially applied lacquer finish
 Projector Series 
 Signia Series
 Signia Marquis Series
 Genista (original 90s version used only birch)
 Gen X (4ply maple/2ply birch)
 Artist Series
 Series Elite (Maple/Birch/Gen-X Hybrid) 
 One series drums – unique one off kits and snares named of British towns and places of interest 
 Modern Classic drums
 Club (rebranded continuation of 1979 Olympic)
 Olympic by Premier(1937-1979, 1991–present), inc. Super Olympic
 Royale

Snare drums
 2000 Snare 
 Royal Ace Snare
 Carmine Appice Signature Snare 
 Project One Snare
 2003 Snare
 2005 Snare
 Heavy Rock Nine 14"X9" Brass Snare
 Modern Classic Snares 
 XC Series – part of the 90th-anniversary line. 
 B.E.A.S.T. Snare
 1005 (Olympic brand)

Hardware
 250 & 250S bass drum pedal
 252 bass drum pedal
 1251 bass drum pedal

Other
 Gordon Mann 1 Wing Pipes and Drums
 Zyn Cymbals (Formerly)

References

External links

 Official website
 Photo's of the derelict factory in 2017

Percussion instrument manufacturing companies
English brands
Manufacturing companies established in 1922
1922 establishments in England
The Beatles' musical instruments
Musical instrument manufacturing companies of the United Kingdom